Henry William Banks Davis  (1833–1914) was a popular English landscape and animal painter, noted for his pastoral scenes, often populated with cattle and other farm animals.

Life and works
He studied and exhibited at the Royal Academy, becoming an associate in 1873 and Royal Academician in 1877, and where he was awarded two silver medals.

Early works were influenced by the Pre-Raphaelites but he later evolved a more individual style and worked on a larger scale. He achieved popularity and his art commanded high prices during his lifetime.

Paintings

A Placid Morning on the Wye.
A Shady Spot on a Summers Day.
A Spring Morning, 1866.
An Orchard in Wales.
Approaching Night, 1899 (Tate Gallery).
Foxhounds in a Landscape.
Gathering the Flocks, Loch Maree, 1883.
Landscape.
Orchard with Sheep in Spring (in Wales).
Portrait of a Jack Russell Terrier (in Regency Interior).
Returning to the Fold, 1880 (Tate Gallery).
Studies of a Welsh Cobb.
Sunset over a Landscape.
Towards Evening in the Forest.
Wooded River Landscape with Cattle Watering.
Mother and Son.

References

Attribution

Further reading
Meynell, Wilfrid. The modern school of art, volume 2 pp. 71–76 (London, W.R. Howell, 1886–8).

External links
 
H W B Davis online (Artcyclopedia)
An orchard in Picardy (Fine Art Dealers Association)
The approach of Bealloch-na-ba, Applecross (Oil on canvas, Christie's)

19th-century English painters
English male painters
20th-century English painters
Landscape artists
Royal Academicians
1833 births
1914 deaths
20th-century English male artists
19th-century English male artists